Capdown is an English punk rock band from Milton Keynes. Originally known as Soap, their songs have political themes as alluded to by their name, which is short for Capitalist Downfall. Mixing ska, punk, hardcore, dub, drum and bass, and reggae, Capdown built a reputation around their independent releases and numerous tours.

Career
In May 2000, the Household Name Records released Capdown's debut album Civil Disobedients. The album featured hardcore, but also mixed in ska and dub. According to Drowned in Sound the album kick started an underground punk scene. The album went on to be listed at 76 in the NME's top one hundred list for the decade. In the same year Capdown played nearly 250 gigs.

In early 2001, Capdown toured with a number of established American bands, including Less Than Jake and played the Deconstruction touring festival with Pennywise and Lagwagon.

In September 2001, Capdown released their second album, Pound for the Sound, receiving positive reviews from Kerrang! The following year saw tours with Bad Religion and Hundred Reasons.

In 2003 the band signed to Fierce Panda Records, releasing two EPs: Act Your Rage and New Revolutionaries. The band received critical acclaim for their live performances.

The final line-up included: Jake Sim-Fielding (vocals and saxophone), Boob Goold (bass guitar), Keith Minter (vocals and guitar), Tim Macdonald (drums) and a new addition, Andrew "Eddie" Hunt (keyboards/samples).

They released an album on 5 February 2007, entitled Wind Up Toys on Fierce Panda Records.

The band split up after their final UK tour, which was due to be 9 November 2007, in their home town of Milton Keynes.  However their 'final show' took place on 7 June 2008, at the Pitz club in Milton Keynes, following a 'warm up' at the Kingston Peel on 5 June 2008.

It was announced on 16 February 2010 through punktastic.com, that Capdown were to reform exclusively for the Slam Dunk Festival, held in London and Leeds on 29 and 30 May that year. However, the band also played at the Rebellion Festival in Blackpool, between 4 and 6 August 2011. In addition, they appeared at Hevy Fest in Kent, between 5 and 8 August 2011 and at the Reading and Leeds Festival on 27-28 August 2011.

In September 2021, the band played Slam Dunk Festival in Leeds and Hatfield, United Kingdom.

Other projects
Following the original demise of Capdown, both Goold and Macdonald worked on a new band, The Maccalites, alongside Simon Wells from Snuff/Southport. Goold, Minter and Macdonald are also members of rock band This Contrast Kills and The GetGone.

As of 2013 Tim Macdonald has been playing drums in the U.K Hardcore band Menshevik along with Steve Pitcher of Vanilla Pod, Dan Hawcroft previously of Whizzwood and Robert Dempsey of Mustard City Rockers.

Since 2012 Robin Goold has been working on The GetGone with Ben Hyman, David Lloyd (1000 Hz) and Rob Blay. The band have released the 5 track 'Stories and Ruses' E.P in 2013, and their debut album 'One thousand ways to live' in April 2016. Both recorded and produced by Capdown's Keith Minter.

Discography

Albums

Singles

Music Videos
 Act Your Rage (2003)
 New Revolutionaries (2003)

Other releases

Critical reception 
In 2021, Loudersound included the band in a 'best of' list, saying "Capdown kick-started something of a movement here in the UK ...", and that if things had gone differently it could have been massive.

References

External links
Official site
Gravity DIP Records Page
Interview with Jake at Onemetal

Musical groups established in 1997
Musical groups disestablished in 2007
Underground punk scene in the United Kingdom
Third-wave ska groups
People from Milton Keynes
English ska musical groups
Fierce Panda Records artists
Political music groups
Post–third wave ska groups